Cyperus albosanguineus is a species of sedge that is native to an area of tropical central and eastern Africa.

The species was first formally described by the botanist Georg Kükenthal in 1936.

See also
 List of Cyperus species

References

albosanguineus
Plants described in 1936
Taxa named by Georg Kükenthal
Flora of Kenya
Flora of Sudan
Flora of Tanzania
Flora of the Democratic Republic of the Congo
Flora of Uganda